Bhopay Wal (chak 23) is a village in the southwest of Pattoki, Pakistan and centre of union council. It has about 520 households and population of about 3,500. It comes under Tehsil administration of Pattoki and District administration of Kasur.

Education 
There are two schools in Bhopay Wal:

Government High School for Boys 
Government Elementary School for Girls

Health 
Government Hospital

Culture 
Bhopay Wal is a centre of cultural activities of the area. There is a regular fair at the end of summer to honour local sufi Baba Gainday Shah.

Economy 
Like many villages of Punjab, Bhopay Wal depends on agriculture.

Populated places in Kasur District